White Zimbabweans also called Rhodesians are people in Zimbabwe who are of European descent. In linguistic, cultural, and historical terms, these Zimbabweans of European ethnic origin are mostly English-speaking descendants of British settlers and a small minority of them are either Afrikaans-speaking descendants of Afrikaners from South Africa and/or those descended from Greek and Portuguese immigrants.

A small number of British migrants first came to the British colony of Southern Rhodesia, later Zimbabwe, as settlers during the late-nineteenth century. A steady migration of European people continued for the next 75 years. The white population of Southern Rhodesia, or just Rhodesia from 1965, reached a peak of about 300,000 in 1975–76, representing around 8% of the population. Emigration after independence as Zimbabwe in 1980 left the white population at around 220,000 in 1980, 70,000 in 2000, and 30,000 in 2012.

Background
Present-day Zimbabwe (known as Southern Rhodesia from 1895) was occupied by the British South Africa Company (BSAC) from the 1890s onward, following the subjugation of the Matabele, (Ndebele), and Shona nations. Early white settlers came in search of mineral resources, hoping to find a second gold-rich Witwatersrand. Zimbabwe lies on a plateau that varies in altitude between 900 and 1,500 m (2,950 and 4,900 ft) above sea level. This gives the area a moderate climate which was conducive to European settlement and commercial agriculture.

In 1930, Land Apportionment and Tenure Acts displaced Africans from the country's best farmland, restricting them to unproductive and low-rainfall tribal-trust lands and reserved high rainfall areas for white ownership. White settlers were attracted to Rhodesia by the availability of tracts of prime farmland that could be purchased from the state at low cost. This resulted in the growth of commercial agriculture in the young colony. The white farm was typically a large (>100 km2 (>38.6 mi2)) mechanized estate, owned by a white family and employing hundreds of black people. Many white farms provided housing, schools and clinics for black employees and their families. At the time of independence in 1980, more than 40% of the country's farmed land comprised approximately 5,000 white farms. At the time, agriculture provided 40% of the country's GDP and up to 60% of its foreign earnings. Major export products included tobacco, beef, sugar, cotton and maize.

The minerals sector was also important. Gold, asbestos, nickel and chromium were mined by foreign-owned concerns such as Lonrho (Lonmin since 1999) and Anglo American. These operations were usually run by white managers, engineers and foremen.

The Census of 3 May 1921 found that Southern Rhodesia had a total population of 899,187, of whom 33,620 were Europeans, 1,998 were Coloured (mixed race), 1,250 Asiatics, 761,790 Bantu natives of Southern Rhodesia and 100,529 Bantu aliens. The following year, Southern Rhodesians rejected, in a referendum, the option of becoming a province of the Union of South Africa. Instead, the country became a self-governing British colony. It never gained full dominion status, although unlike other colonies it was treated as a de facto dominion, with its Prime Minister attending the Commonwealth Prime Ministers' Conferences.

Immigration
In 1891, before Southern Rhodesia was established as a territory, it was estimated that about 1,500 Europeans resided there. This number grew slowly to around 75,000 in 1945. In the period 1945 to 1955, the white population doubled to 150,000, and during that decade 100,000 black people were forcibly resettled from farmland designated for white ownership. However, some members of the white farming community opposed the forced removal of black people from land designated for white ownership, and some even favoured the handover of underutilised "white land" to black farmers. For example, in 1947, Wedza white farmer Harry Meade unsuccessfully opposed the eviction of his black neighbour Solomon Ndawa from a  irrigated wheat farm. Meade represented Ndawa at hearings of the Land Commission and attempted to protect Ndawa from abusive questioning.

Large-scale migration to Rhodesia did not begin until after the Second World War. At the colony's first comprehensive census in 1962, Rhodesia had 221,000 white residents. At its peak in the mid-1970s, Rhodesia's white population consisted of as many as 277,000. There were influxes of white immigrants from the 1940s through to the early-1970s. The most conspicuous group were former British servicemen in the immediate post-war period. However, many of the new immigrants were refugees from Communism in Europe; others were former service personnel from British India, or came from the former Kenya Colony, the Belgian Congo, Zambia, Algeria, and Mozambique. For a time, Rhodesia provided something of a haven for white people who were retreating from decolonisation elsewhere in Africa and Asia.

Post-World War II Rhodesian white settlers were considered different in character from earlier Rhodesian settlers and those from other British colonies, such as Kenya, where settlers were perceived to be drawn from "the officer class" and from the British landowning class. By contrast, settlers in Rhodesia after the Second World War were perceived as being drawn from lower social strata and were treated accordingly by the British authorities; as Peter Godwin wrote in The Guardian, "Foreign Office mandarins dismissed white Rhodesians as lower middle class, no more than provincial clerks and artisans, the lowly NCOs of empire."

Various factors encouraged the growth of the white population of Rhodesia. These included the industrialisation and prosperity of the economy in the post-war period. The National Party victory in South Africa was one of the factors that led to the formation of the Central African Federation (1953-1963), so as to provide a bulwark against Afrikaner nationalism. British settlement and investment boomed during the Federation years, as Southern Rhodesia, Northern Rhodesia (now Zambia) and Nyasaland (now Malawi) formed a powerful economic unit, counterbalancing the economic power of South Africa. The economic power of these three areas was a major factor in the establishment of the Federation through a British Act of Parliament. It was also apparent as early as the 1950s that white rule would continue for longer in Rhodesia than it would in other British colonies such as Zambia (Northern Rhodesia) and Kenya. Many of the new immigrants had a "not here" attitude to majority rule and independence.

Rhodesia was run by a white minority government. In 1965, that government declared itself independent through a Unilateral Declaration of Independence ('UDI') under Prime Minister Ian Smith. The UDI project eventually failed, after a period of United Nations economic sanctions and a civil war known as the Chimurenga (Shona) or Bush War. British colonial rule returned in December 1979, when the country became the British Dependency of Southern Rhodesia. In April 1980, it was granted independence as Zimbabwe.

The white community kept itself largely separate from the black and Asian communities in the country. Urban white people lived in separate areas of town, and white people had their own segregated education, healthcare and recreational facilities. Marriage between black and white people was possible, but remains to the present day very rare. The 1903 Immorality Suppression Ordinance made "illicit" (i.e. unmarried) sex between black men and white women illegal – with a penalty of two years imprisonment for any offending white woman. The majority of the early white immigrants were men, and some white men entered into relationships with black women. The result was a small number of mixed-race persons: 1,998 out of a total 899,187 inhabitants, according to the 1921 census, some of whom were accepted as being white. A proposal by Garfield Todd (Prime Minister, 1953–1958) to liberalise the laws regarding interracial sex was viewed as dangerously radical. The proposal was rejected and was one factor that led to the political demise of Todd.

White Rhodesians enjoyed a very high standard of living. The Land Tenure Act had reserved 30% of agricultural land for white ownership. black labour costs were low (around US$40 per month in 1975) and included free housing, food and clothing. Nurses earned US$120 per month. The low wages had a large effect in the context of an agricultural economy. Public spending on education, healthcare and other social services was heavily weighted towards white people. Most of the better paid jobs in public service were also reserved for white people. White people in skilled manual occupations enjoyed employment protection against black competition. In 1975, the average annual income for a white Rhodesian was around US$8,000 with income tax at a marginal rate of 5% — making them one of the richest communities in the world.

Decline
In November 1965, in order to avoid the introduction of black majority rule (commonly referred to at the time as the Wind of Change), the Government of what was then the self-governing colony of Southern Rhodesia issued the Unilateral Declaration of Independence (UDI), upon which the country became the de facto independent – albeit unrecognised — state of Rhodesia.

As was the case in most European colonies, white immigrants took a privileged position in all areas of society. Extensive areas of prime farmland were owned by whites. Senior positions in the public services were reserved for whites, and whites working in manual occupations enjoyed legal protection against job competition from black Africans. As time passed, this situation became increasingly unwelcome to the majority ethnic groups within the country and also to wide sections of international opinion, leading to the Rhodesian Bush War and eventually the Lancaster House Agreement in 1979.

After the country's reconstitution as the Republic of Zimbabwe in 1980, whites had to adjust to being an ethnic minority in a country with a black majority government. Although a significant number of whites remained, many white people emigrated in the early-1980s, both in fear for their lives and an uncertain future. Political unrest and the seizure of many white-owned commercial farms resulted in a further exodus of whites commencing in 1999. The 2002 census recorded 46,743 white people living in Zimbabwe. More than 10,000 were elderly and fewer than 9,000 were under the age of 15.

At the time of Zimbabwean independence in 1980, it was estimated that around 38% of white Zimbabweans were UK-born, with slightly fewer born in what was once Rhodesia, and around 20% from elsewhere in Africa. The white population of that era contained a large transient element, and many white people might better be considered foreign expatriates than settlers. Between 1960 and 1979, white emigration to Rhodesia was around 180,000, while white emigration overseas was 202,000 (with an average white population of around 240,000).

Post-independence

The country gained its independence as Zimbabwe in April 1980, under a ZANU-PF government led by Robert Mugabe. Following independence, the country's white citizens lost most of their former privileges. A generous social welfare net (including both education and healthcare) that had supported white people in Rhodesia disappeared almost in an instant. White people in the artisan, skilled worker and supervisory classes began to experience job competition from black people. Indigenisation in the public services displaced many white people. The result was that white emigration gathered pace. In the ten-year period from 1980 to 1990, approximately two-thirds of the white community left Zimbabwe.

However, many white people resolved to stay in the new Zimbabwe; only one-third of the white farming community left. An even smaller proportion of white urban business owners and members of the professional classes left. This pattern of migration meant that although small in absolute numbers, Zimbabwe's white people formed a high proportion of the upper strata of society.

A 1984 article in The Sunday Times Magazine described and pictured the life of Zimbabwean white people at a time when their number was just about to fall below 100,000. About 49% of emigrants left to settle in South Africa, many of whom were Afrikaans speakers, with 29% going to the British Isles; most of the remainder went to Australia, New Zealand, Canada, and the United States. Many of these emigrants continue to identify themselves as Rhodesian. A white Rhodesian/Zimbabwean who is nostalgic for the UDI era is known colloquially as a "Rhodie". These nostalgic "Rhodesians" are also sometimes referred to by the pejorative "Whenwes", because of the nostalgia expressed by them in the phrase "when we were in Rhodesia". The white community which remained in Zimbabwe and accepted the situation is known as a "Zimbo".

The 1979 Lancaster House Agreement, which was the basis for independence from the United Kingdom, had precluded compulsory land redistribution in favour of subsidised voluntary sale of land by white owners for a period of at least 10 years. The pattern of land ownership established during the Rhodesian state therefore survived for some time after independence. Those white people who were prepared to adapt to the situation they found themselves in were therefore able to continue enjoying a very comfortable existence. In fact, the independence settlement, combined with favourable economic conditions (including the Economic Structural Adjustment Programme), produced a 20-year period of unprecedented prosperity for white Zimbabwean people, and for the white farming community in particular; a new class of "young white millionaires" appeared in the farming sector. These were typically young Zimbabweans who had applied skills learned in agricultural colleges and business schools in Europe. In 1989, Commercial Farmers' Union president John Brown commented, "This is the best government for commercial farmers that this country has ever seen".

The lifting of UN-imposed economic sanctions and the end of the Bush War at the time of independence produced an immediate 'peace dividend'. Renewed access to world capital markets made it possible to finance major new infrastructure developments in transport and schools. One area of economic growth was tourism, catering in particular to visitors from Europe and North America. Many white people found work in this sector. Another area of growth was horticulture, involving the cultivation of flowers, fruits and vegetables, which were air-freighted to market in Europe. Many white farmers were involved in this, and in 2002 it was claimed that 8% of horticultural imports into Europe were sourced in Zimbabwe. The economic migrant element among the white population had departed quickly after independence, leaving behind those white people with deeper roots in the country. The country settled and the white population stabilised.

Chris McGreal, writing in The Observer in April 2008, claimed that Zimbabwe's white people "... kept their houses and their pools and their servants. The white farmers had it even better. With crop prices soaring they bought boats on Lake Kariba and built air strips on their farms for newly acquired planes. Zimbabwe's whites reached an implicit understanding with Zanu-PF; they could go on as before, so long as they kept out of politics".

White Zimbabweans with professional skills were readily accepted in the new order. For example, Chris Andersen had been the hardline Rhodesian justice minister, but made a new career for himself as an independent MP and leading attorney in Zimbabwe. In 1998, he defended former President Canaan Banana in the infamous "sodomy trial". At the time of this trial, Andersen spoke out against the attitude of President Mugabe who had described homosexuals as being "worse than dogs and pigs since they are a colonial invention, unknown in African tradition.

Land
By the mid-1990s, it is thought that around 120,000 white people remained in Zimbabwe. In spite of this small number, the white Zimbabwean minority maintained control of much of the economy through its investment in commercial farms, industry, and tourism. However, an ongoing programme of land reforms (intended to alter the ethnic balance of land ownership) dislodged many white farmers. The level of violence associated with these reforms in some rural areas made the position of the wider white community uncomfortable. Twenty years after independence, there were 21,000 commercial farmers in the country, of whom 4,000 were white and 17,000 were black.

The "land issue" problem came to assume a very high profile in Zimbabwe's political life. ZANU politicians sought to revise Rhodesian land apportionment, which they saw as an injustice that required 'correction', and pressed for land to be transferred from white to black ownership, regardless of the resultant disruption to agricultural output. White farmers argued that this served little purpose, since Zimbabwe has ample agricultural land, much of which was either vacant or only lightly cultivated. Therefore, to their eyes, the problem was really a lack of development, rather than one of land tenure. White farmers would respond to claims that they owned "70% of the best arable land" by stating that what they actually owned was "70% of the best developed arable land", and therefore that the two are entirely different things. Whatever the merits of the arguments, in the post-Independence period, the land issue assumed enormous symbolic importance to all concerned. As the euphoria of independence subsided, and as a variety of economic and social problems became evident in the late-1990s, the land issue became a focus for trouble.

In 1999, the government initiated a "fast track land reform" programme. This was intended to transfer 4,000 white farms, covering 110,000 km2 (42,470 mi2) of mostly prime farmland, to black ownership. The means used to implement the programme were ad-hoc, and involved forcible seizure in many cases.

By mid-2006, only 500 of the original 5,000 white farms were still fully operational. The majority of the white farms that avoided expropriation were in Manicaland and Midlands, where it proved possible to do local deals and form strategic partnerships. However, by early-2007, a number of the seized farms were being leased back to their former white owners (although in reduced size and/or on a contract basis); it has been claimed to be possible that as many as 1,000 of them could be operational again, in some form.

A University of Zimbabwe sociologist told IWPR journalist Benedict Unendoro the esprit de corps of the white dominant class in the former Rhodesia prevented the poor white people from becoming a recognisable social group, because of the social assistance provided by the dominant social class on racial grounds. This system broke down after the founding of Zimbabwe, causing the number of poor white people to increase, especially after 2000, when the confiscation of white-owned farms took its toll. As rich white land owners emigrated or fended for themselves financially, their white employees, who mainly worked as supervisors of black labour, found themselves destitute on the streets of cities like Harare, with many found begging around urban centres like Eastlea. The land confiscated from white owners has been redistributed to black peasant farmers and smallholders, acquired by commercial land companies, or persons connected to the government.

Sympathisers of the expropriated white farmers have claimed that lack of professional management skills among the new landholders has resulted in a dramatic decline in Zimbabwe's agricultural production. Indeed, in an effort to boost their own agricultural output, neighbouring countries, including Mozambique and Zambia, offered land and other incentives to entice Zimbabwe's white farmers to emigrate.

By 2008, an estimated one in ten out of 5,000 white farmers remained on their land. Many of these continued to face intimidation, however. By June 2008, it was reported that only 280 white farmers remained, and all of their farms were invaded.

On the day of Mugabe's inauguration as president on 28 June 2008, several white farmers who had protested the seizure of their land were beaten and burned by his supporters. In June 2008, a British-born farmer, Ben Freeth (who has had several articles and letters published in the British press regarding the hostile situation), and his in-laws, Mike and Angela Campbell, were abducted and found badly beaten. Campbell, speaking from hospital in Harare, vowed to continue with his legal fight for his farm. In November 2008, a SADC tribunal ruled that the government had racially discriminated against Campbell, denied him legal redress, and prevented him from defending his farm.

White millionaires 
John Bredenkamp started his trading business during the UDI era, when he developed expertise in "sanctions busting". He is reported to have arranged the export of Rhodesian tobacco and the import of components (including parts and munitions for the Rhodesian government's force of Hunter jets) in the face of UN trade sanctions. Bredenkamp was able to continue and expand his business after independence, making himself a personal fortune estimated at around US$1 billion.

A number of white entrepreneurs have been attracted to Zimbabwe from other countries in recent years. Controversial British businessman Nicholas van Hoogstraten has built up a 4200 km2 (1620 mi2) land holding in central Zimbabwe through his corporate interests (mainly Messina Investments). Far from losing land to resettlement, van Hoogstraten has actually been able to purchase new property since 2000. Van Hoogstraten, a man with a criminal history, has described President Mugabe as "100 percent decent and incorruptible" and "a true English gentleman". Van Hoogstraten is reported to have arranged supplies for Zimbabwean forces in the DRC and to have underwritten arms deals for the Mugabe administration. However, by 2008 van Hoogstraten appeared to have fallen out with the Zimbabwean establishment.

Several white Zimbabwean businessmen, such as Billy Rautenbach, have returned to their native country after working abroad for some years. Rautenbach has succeeded in extending Zimbabwean minerals sector activity into neighbouring countries such as the DRC.

Charles Davy is one of the largest private landowners in Zimbabwe. Davy is reported to own 1,200 km2 (460 mi2) of land, including farms at Ripple Creek, Driehoek, Dyer's Ranch and Mlelesi. His property has been almost unaffected by any form of land redistribution, and he denies that this fact has any link to his business relationship with the politician Webster Shamu. Davy has said about Shamu, "I am in partnership with a person who I personally like and get along with". Other views on Shamu are less kind.

Davy is married to Beverley, a former model and "Miss Rhodesia" 1973. Their daughter Chelsy, born and raised in Bulawayo, was the long-standing girlfriend of Prince Harry until their split in January 2009.

In the 1970s, the Campbell family reportedly had various business interests, as well as large landholdings in Salisbury and the Chikomba area of the Mashonaland East Province. With the exception of the Pomona Stone Quarry, virtually all of their assets were seized on Alpes Road in Southern Harare, together with their holding company listing. Some family members have reportedly moved to the United Kingdom or South Africa.

The Belfast-born socialite Hazel Crane, naturalised as both a Rhodesian and a South African citizen, made her fortune as a diamond smuggler in the UDI-era Rhodesia. Crane's first husband was in the Rhodesian Army, fighting in the Bush War, when he was killed at the age of 25. Crane then had a child and was pregnant with the couple's second, and turned to a life of crime after his death. Her activities included smuggling diamonds and emeralds, making blackmarket currency deals, owning a striptease joint, and selling hard-core pornography. In her biography, which appeared after her unexplained death, she describes how she would tuck emeralds into her beehive hairdo or pack them into her son's nappies for smuggling. Crane invested her profits in legitimate businesses such as the Copa Cobana restaurant, one of Rhodesia's most popular and fashionable meeting places. In later life, she was a commodity broker.

The political environment in Zimbabwe has allowed the development of an exploitative business culture, in which some white businessmen have played a prominent role. When Zimbabwe was subject to EU sanctions, arising from its involvement in the DRC from 1998, the government was able to call on sanctions-busting expertise and personnel from the UDI era to provide parts and munitions for its force of Hawk jets. After 25 years of ZANU-PF government, Zimbabwe had become a congenial place for white millionaires of a certain kind to live and do business in.

Violence against whites

In the 2000s, there was a surge in violence against Zimbabwe's dwindling white community and the main targets of this violence are Zimbabwe's white farmers. On 18 September 2010, droves of white people were chased away and prevented from participating in the constitutional outreach programme in Harare during a weekend, in which violence and confusion marred the process, with similar incidents having occurred in Graniteside. In Mount Pleasant, white families were subjected to a torrent of abuse by suspected Zanu-PF supporters, who later drove them away and shouted racial slurs. There were also many illegal seizures of white-owned farmland by the government and its supporters. By March 2000, little land had been redistributed as per the land reform laws that were passed in 1979, when the Lancaster House Agreement between Britain and Zimbabwe pledged to initiate a fairer distribution of land between the white minority, which governed Zimbabwe from 1890 to 1979, and the black population.

However, at this stage, land acquisition could only occur on a voluntary basis. Little land had been redistributed, and frustrated groups of government supporters began seizing white-owned farms. Most of the seizures took place in Nyamandhalovu and Inyati. After the beating to death of a prominent farmer in September 2011, the head of the Commercial Farmers' Union decried the attack, saying that its white members continue to be targeted for violence, without protection from the government. Genocide Watch declared that the violence against whites in Zimbabwe was a stage 5 (of 10) case of genocide. In September 2014, Mugabe publicly declared that all white Zimbabweans should "go back to England", and he urged black Zimbabweans not to lease agricultural land to white farmers.

Arts
Several cultural organisations existed during white-minority rule that mainly served the interests of the community. These included The National Gallery, The National Arts Foundation and the Salisbury Arts Council.

Literature
Artistic expression often portrays "the melancholy white exile" from Zimbabwe who secretly longs to return home.

Nobel Prize-winning writer Doris Lessing, who lived in Southern Rhodesia between 1924 and 1949 and had two children there, published works about the colonial experience and exposing racial hostilities. Her 1950 novel, The Grass Is Singing, is set in Southern Rhodesia in the late 1940s and deals with racial injustice. The book was banned in Southern Rhodesia until independence in 1980. She visited her children in the country in 1956, but was declared a "prohibited immigrant", and banned from returning for political reasons. She visited the country many times after independence, and published her accounts of the visits in the book African Laughter: Four Visits to Zimbabwe in 1992. In her 2008 semi-fictional/non-fiction novel Alfred and Emily, Southern Rhodesia is a prominent backdrop in the second "factual" part of her account of her parents' lives.

Peter Godwin, who was born in Salisbury (now Harare) in 1957, to English and Polish parents, has written several books with a Zimbabwean background, including Rhodesians Never Die (1984) and When a Crocodile Eats the Sun (2007). The theme of these books is the impact of political change in Zimbabwe on the country's white community. Godwin regularly contributes to newspapers, TV and radio on Zimbabwean affairs. His writing has been influenced by the death of one of his sisters in a "friendly fire" incident during the Bush War in the 1970s. Another sibling, Georgina Godwin, was a presenter on Zimbabwe TV and radio until 2001, and has more recently been a UK-based journalist and podcaster.

Douglas Rogers has also enjoyed success chronicling his parents' struggle to hold onto their game farm and backpackers resort in The Last Resort. In 2010, the book won the British Guild of Travel Writers award for Best Narrative Travel Book.

Catherine Buckle has also tackled the issue of chaotic land reforms; her books are African Tears and Beyond Tears. The former deals with the emotional struggle that she and her family faced as war veterans invaded her farm. She also explores the traumatic situation facing farm workers and other farming families in similar positions to hers. In Beyond Tears, she speaks to the family of a murdered farmer, to five farmers who were abducted, as well as to rape victims. She also returns to visit her once-productive farm, which has been burnt to the ground and turned into a squatter camp.

South Africa-born novelist and poet John Eppel was raised in Southern Rhodesia and is a Zimbabwean citizen. His works have been released to critical acclaim; in particular, he has enjoyed success with D G G Berry's The Great North Road. In particular, he deals with themes such as the Rhodesian Bush War, independence and neo-colonialism.

Heidi Holland (1947–2012) was the former editor of Illustrated Life Rhodesia under her married name, Heidi Hull. She later wrote for The Sunday Times, The New York Times and The Telegraph. Her final book, Dinner With Mugabe (2008), gained significant media attention and allowed a rare insight into Zimbabwean President Robert Mugabe.

Alexandra Fuller wrote of her childhood in the 1970s on a farm in Don't Let's Go to the Dogs Tonight, which won the Winifred Holtby Memorial Prize in 2002. It was also a New York Times Notable Book for 2002, and a finalist for The Guardian'''s First Book Award. Scribbling the Cat (2004) recounted a return journey as an adult, travelling with a troubled ex-soldier, attempting to lay childhood ghosts to rest. It won the Lettre Ulysses Award for the Art of Reportage in 2006. Lauren Liebenberg also centred her debut novel, The Voluptuous Delights of Peanut Butter and Jam, on a Rhodesian farm in 1978. It was nominated for the Orange Prize for Fiction in 2008. Liebenberg drew upon some of her own experiences as a child growing up in war-torn Rhodesia.

Alexander McCall Smith, who was born and brought up in Southern Rhodesia, has also enjoyed notable success. In particular, he is known as the creator of the Africa-inspired series The No. 1 Ladies' Detective Agency, set in neighbouring Botswana.

Music and theatre
Patriotic folk songs were particularly popular amongst the white community during the Rhodesian Bush War. A leading musical figure was Clem Tholet, who married Ian Smith's stepdaughter Jean Smith in 1967. Tholet became famous for patriotic anthems such as Rhodesians Never Die, and he enjoyed gold status (for over 60,000 sales) with his first album, Songs of Love & War., recorded at Shed Studios.

Another popular folk singer was Northern Rhodesian-born John Edmond, a former soldier of the (Southern) Rhodesian Army, who also enjoyed considerable success during the Rhodesian Bush War. He had hits with patriotic folk songs such as "The U.D.I. Song" from his popular Troopiesongs album.

Concert pianist Manuel Bagorro (born Salisbury, 1968) is the founder and artistic director of The Harare International Festival of the Arts (HIFA). First held in 1999, the Festival was most recently held in April 2008, and was successful in attracting attention to the arts in Zimbabwe at a difficult time. Bagorro's audio diary of the Festival, set against the background of the 2008 elections, was broadcast in instalments by the BBC World Service. The theme of HIFA was "north meets south", with contributions from African and European cultures.

Cape Town-based white Zimbabwean Simon Attwell is a band member of the popular South African group Freshlyground, playing the flute, mbira, sax, and harmonica. Freshlyground combines both African and European musical traditions, and they participated in the 2008 HIFA.

The jazz composer, bandleader, and trombonist Mike Gibbs was born in Salisbury, Southern Rhodesia. Other internationally successful artists born there include the Royal Ballet prima ballerina Dame Merle Park and actress Susan Burnet, whose grandfather was one of the country's first white settlers.

Theatre was immensely popular across African colonies amongst bourgeoise white residents, often seeking the culture of European metropoles. The construction of larger theatres boomed in the twentieth century in colonies most populated by white people, such as Kenya, Southern Rhodesia and the copper belt of Northern Rhodesia. 'Little theatres' were also popular; often, they were part of large sporting venues, gymkhana and turf clubs. In 1910, one author remarked on the popularity of theatre amongst Southern Rhodesia's white population: "the local population must have spent a considerable amount on theatre seats. Fifteen professional companies went on tour that year." Theatres in Southern African colonies were usually situated next to a railway line, and the premier European dramatic performance in then Southern Rhodesia took place in the southern region of Bulawayo. The development of rail infrastructure allowed the involvement of entertainers from neighbouring South Africa.

The National Theatre Organisation, formerly The National Theatre Foundation, focussed on Euro-centric theatre productions. These included plays such as A Midsummer Night's Dream and No Sex Please, We're British.

A younger white Zimbabwean actor and playwright is Scott Sparrow; the Rhodes University drama graduate was in several South African theatre productions, as well as Zimbabwean productions, when he was younger. In 2006, at the age of 23, he wrote his first play, Performers' Travel Guide, staged at the Intimate Theatre. Sparrow plays 17 characters in the one-man play, concerning the disappearance of a woman's child ten years earlier. Along with South African veteran theatre-maker Nicholas Ellenbogen, he was invited to put on a play for the King of Venda. Sparrow directed the play entitled African Dream Salon for the King.

Film and broadcasting
Doris Lessing's Southern Rhodesia novel The Grass is Singing was adapted into a film by a Swedish company and released in 1981. Despite the majority of the original novel taking place in then Southern Rhodesia and earlier scenes in South Africa, the adaptation was filmed in Zambia and Sweden. The film stars Karen Black and John Thaw as the poverty-stricken white farming couple Mary and Dick Turner, and John Kani as the black houseboy and love-interest of Mary Turner. The Grass is Singing film adaptation is also known under the titles of Gräset Sjunger (Swedish) and Killing Heat.

A more recent portrayal of a white Zimbabwean was by Leonardo DiCaprio in the 2006 film Blood Diamond. He plays the leading fictional character of Danny Archer, an ex-mercenary, diamond-smuggler and self-proclaimed "Rhodesian", whose parents were murdered on their farm by rebels. The adventure drama film is set in 1999 during the Sierra Leone Civil War.

Another prominent performance was by Nicole Kidman in the 2005 film The Interpreter, the final film by celebrated director Sydney Pollack. Kidman plays the lead role of Silvia Broome, a white African and New York-based United Nations interpreter raised in the fictional African republic of Matobo. The film centres on the pending visit of the President of Matobo to address the UN in New York; Broome's parents and sister have been killed earlier by a land mine leading to their farm, and soon her brother is murdered in Matobo. There has been much speculation that Matabo is symbolic of Zimbabwe: its flag bears a striking resemblance to the Zimbabwean one, and there is in fact a Matobo National Park in Zimbabwe. There are also striking parallels between Matabo's history and that of Zimbabwe. The president of Matobo is presented in a manner similar to the President of Zimbabwe, Robert Mugabe; for example, by referring to him as the "teacher", a nickname shared by Mugabe, in reference to his teaching career. The striking parallels between Matobo and Zimbabwe provoked a reaction from the Zimbabwean government; Acting Information Minister Chen Chimutengwende said that the film had "obvious connections", and that it was part of a "CIA plot" to discredit the Southern African nation.BBC 5 September 2005

The 1980 film Shamwari, also known as Chain Gang Killings in the United States, is an action thriller about two escaped prisoners, one Black, one white and their developing friendship. The film was set and filmed in Rhodesia, starring several local white actors, such as Tamara Franke in the role of Tracy. Four years later, Franke had a major role in Go for Gold.

In 1960, television was introduced into the then Southern Rhodesia, as Rhodesia Television. It was the first such service in the region, as South Africa did not introduce television until 1976, due to the potential ideological conflicts that it posed. The Rhodesian Broadcasting Corporation took over from Rhodesia Television (RTV) as RBCTV in 1976. As previously, this was a commercial service carrying advertising, although there was also a television licence fee. Television reception was confined mainly to the large cities, and the majority of television personalities and viewers were from the white minority. Both RTV and RBC used the BBC as a model, in that a government department was not responsible for it, but instead, a board of governors (selected by Ian Smith) were. Popular television shows included Kwizzkids, Frankly Partridge and Music Time. Possibly the best-known Director of the RBC was Dr. Harvey Ward. Prior to the introduction of television, RBC had developed a successful radio network, which continued. By 1978, three top white executives had fled overseas, including Dr. Ward, of whom it was said "probably more than any other person, became identified with the right-wing bias on Rhodesia's radio and TV networks." The RBC was later succeeded by the Zimbabwe Rhodesia Corporation, and later in its present form as the Zimbabwe Broadcasting Corporation. The character Horace Von Khute, from the British television series Fonejacker is a Rhodesian who works for the police in intercepting a Ugandan bank scammer.

Until her departure in 2001, Georgina Godwin, the sister of author Peter Godwin, was a celebrity DJ for the corporation and a television personality; she was described by Britain's The Guardian newspaper as Zimbabwe's Sara Cox. She previously hosted a morning drive-time show and gossip column in Zimbabwe. More recently, she was involved in the London-based SW Radio Africa, a station with the purpose of broadcasting independently of Zimbabwean state interference. Godwin has conducted various interviews for the station with figures such as Desmond Tutu and Zanu-PF firebrand Jocelyn Chiwenga.

In 2009, the documentary film Mugabe and the White African premiered at the London Film Festival to rave reviews. The film deals with a white Zimbabwean farming family working against Mugabe's draconian land reform policies.

 Sports 

Before 1980, Rhodesian representation in international sporting events was almost exclusively white. Zimbabwean participation in some international sporting events continued to be white-dominated until well into the 1990s. For example, no Black player was selected for the Zimbabwean cricket team until 1995. Rally driver Conrad Rautenbach (son of Billy) won the FIA African Championship, scoring at the Dunlop Zimbabwe Challenge Rally in 2005 and 2006. An iconic event is the all-white Zimbabwean women's field hockey team, captained by Ann Grant (formerly Ann Fletcher) and winning gold medals at the Moscow Olympics in July 1980 (Ann Grant's brother, cricketer Duncan Fletcher, later became manager of the England cricket team). 

An exception to this trend during the 1960s and 1970s was in association football, where the national team was predominantly black, with the notable exceptions of the white forward Bobby Chalmers, who captained the team during its unsuccessful attempt to qualify for the 1970 World Cup, and goalkeeper Bruce Grobbelaar.

A large number of Zimbabwe's most famous athletes are white. In tennis, the Black family of Cara, Byron and Wayne Black, and Kevin Ullyett, are notable doubles players. In the 1990s, Zimbabwe's largely white cricket team was a strong one, and included world class players such as Andy Flower, Grant Flower amongst others. Today, Zimbabwe's National Cricket Team still has several white players, including Brendan Taylor and Sean Williams. Furthermore, Zimbabwe's most successful recent Olympic athlete is swimmer Kirsty Coventry, who won three medals (including gold) at the 2004 Summer Olympics, and four medals (including gold) at the 2008 Summer Olympics. Famous white Zimbabwean golfers include Nick Price, Mark McNulty and Brendon de Jonge.

Although she represented South Africa, Rhodesian-born Charlene Wittstock, who was brought up in Bulawayo before moving to South Africa at the age of ten, has achieved success as a swimmer. She has also become a celebrity figure, owing to her marriage to Prince Albert II Sovereign Prince of Monaco.

Australian rugby union player David Pocock is also a well-known Zimbabwean, having emigrated to Australia in 2002.

 Involvement of white people in Zimbabwean politics 

 Political and economic background 

During the UDI era, Rhodesia developed a siege economy as the means of withstanding UN sanctions. The country operated a strict system of exchange and import controls, while major export items were channelled through state trade agencies (such as 'the Grain Marketing Board'). This approach was continued until around 1990, at which time International Monetary Fund and World Bank development funding was made conditional upon the adoption of economic liberalisation. In 1991, Zimbabwe adopted the ESAP (Economic Structural Adjustment Programme), which required privatisation, the removal of exchange and import controls, trade deregulation and the phasing out of export subsidies. Up until the time of independence, the economy relied mainly on the export of a narrow range of primary products, including tobacco, asbestos and gold. In the post-independence period, the world markets for all these products deteriorated, and it was hoped that the ESAP would facilitate diversification.

ESAP and its successor ZIMPREST (Zimbabwe Programme for Economic and Social Transformation) caused considerable economic turbulence. Some sectors of the economy did benefit, but the immediate results included job losses, a rise in poverty, and a series of exchange rate crises. The associated economic downturn caused the budget deficit to rise, which put pressure on public services, and the means used to finance the budget deficit caused hyperinflation. These factors created a situation in which many bright and qualified Zimbabweans (both black and white) had to look abroad for work opportunities. 

Zimbabwean politics since 1990 have therefore been conducted against a background of economic difficulty, with the manufacturing sector (in particular) being 'hollowed out'. However, some parts of the economy continue to perform well: the Zimbabwe stock exchange and property market have experienced minor booms, while outsiders are coming to invest in both mining and land operations.

In the period immediately after independence, some white political leaders (such as Ian Smith) sought to maintain the identity of white Zimbabweans as a separate group. In particular, they wished to maintain a separate "white roll", maintaining the election of 20 seats in parliament reserved for white people; this was abolished in 1987. Despite this, a number of white Zimbabweans embraced the political changes, and many even joined Zanu-PF in the 1980s and 1990s: for example, Timothy Stamps served as Minister of Health in the Zimbabwean government from 1986 to 2002.

 Wealthy Zimbabweans 

In the 2000s, an elite network of white businessmen and senior military officers became associated with a faction of ZANU-PF identified with Emmerson Mnangagwa, a former Security Minister and later Speaker of Parliament. Mnangagwa was described by reporters of the Daily News as "the richest politician in Zimbabwe". He is believed to have favoured the early retirement of President Mugabe, and a conciliatory approach towards the regime's domestic opponents; this line has displeased other elements in ZANU-PF. In June 2006, John Bredenkamp (a prominent former Mnangagwa associate) fled Zimbabwe in his private jet, after government investigations into the affairs of his Breco trading company were started. Bredenkamp returned to Zimbabwe in September 2006, after his passport was returned by court order.

In July 2002, 92 prominent Zimbabweans were subject to EU "smart sanctions", intended to express disapproval of various Zimbabwe government policies. These persons were banned from the EU, and access to assets they own in the EU was frozen. Ninety-one of those on the blacklist were black, and one was white: Dr. Timothy Stamps.

Many observers found the EU's treatment of Dr. Stamps to be curious, given that by July 2002 he was retired from active politics and a semi-invalid. In addition, Stamps was widely considered to be a highly dedicated doctor who had never been implicated in any form of wrongdoing. The same observers found it equally strange that the EU Commission did not include the wealthy white backers of Mugabe on the list.

 Movement for Democratic Change and 2000 general election 

From around 1990 onwards, mainstream white opinion favoured opposition politics to that of Mugabe's ZANU party, who controlled the government. White Zimbabweans sought to vote for liberal economics, democracy and the rule of law. White people had lain low in the immediate post-independence period, but, in 1999 they recognised a common disquiet with the majority of people over ZANU excesses in government, and gave whites an opportunity to vote for an opposition, which initially grew out of the trade union movements who were enabling citizens to have a voice and vote with the majority of Zimbabweans.

Roy Bennett, a white farmer forced off his coffee plantation after it was overrun by radical militants and then expropriated, won a strong victory in the Chimanimani constituency (adjoining the Mozambican border) in the 2000 general election. Bennett (a former Conservative Alliance of Zimbabwe member) won his seat for the Movement for Democratic Change, and was one of four white MDC constituency MPs elected in 2000.Sokwanele: Roy Bennett released 

Other white MPs elected in 2000 included David Coltart (a prominent human rights lawyer and founding legal secretary of the MDC) and Michael Auret (a civil rights activist of long standing, who had opposed white minority rule in the 1970s). Trudy Stevenson was a white American who had lived in Uganda until 1972, before fleeing from the regime of Idi Amin. Stevenson served as the MDC's Secretary for Policy and Research before being elected to Parliament. In July 2006, after attending a political meeting in the Harare suburb of Mabvuku, Stevenson was attacked, suffering panga wounds to the back of her neck and head. The MDC leadership immediately claimed that the attack was carried out by ZANU militants; however, while recovering in hospital, the MP for Harare North positively identified her assailants as members of a rival faction of the MDC. This incident illustrates the violent and faction-ridden nature of Zimbabwean politics. Zimbabwean politicians routinely accuse each other of murder, theft, electoral fraud, conspiracy and treason; it is often difficult to know the truth of such stories.

One MDC spokesmen is Eddie Cross. Cross is a leading Zimbabwean business figure, and serves as the MDC's Economic Secretary and shadow finance minister. Although critical of the ZANU-PF government, Cross has been an advocate of the economic liberalisation that the government introduced.

The 2000 general election was arguably the most significant event in post-independence Zimbabwean politics; it was the first seriously contested election in the country since 1962, and was fought out against a background of intractable economic, social and political problems. The ZANU ruling party had been in power for 20 years, and was widely considered to have run out of ideas. White people played a leading role in the campaign of the opposition MDC party, which almost won the election. Radical elements in the country perceived the MDC project to have been an attempt to restore a limited form of white minority rule, and this produced a violent backlash.BBC report, October 2000 :Mugabe under pressure 

 Recent developments 
From 2000, there was an increasing sense in the white Zimbabwean community that the rule of law has been selectively applied to crimes committed towards their own members.

The Independence constitution contained a provision requiring the Zimbabwean government to honour pension obligations due to former servants of the Rhodesian state. This obligation included payment in foreign currency to pensioners living outside Zimbabwe (almost all white). Pension payments were made until the 1990s, but they then became erratic and stopped altogether in 2003.

White communities in African countries did not all follow the same path in the post-colonial period. In some post-colonial African countries such as Kenya, Namibia, and Botswana the white communities survived and actually increased in number. Other nations such as Zambia actively appealed to white African farmers, agricultural workers and industrialists to emigrate to the country to help develop the economy, a scheme some displaced white Zimbabweans have taken advantage of. In two particular cases, Algeria and Zimbabwe, the previously large European communities have shrunk. In both these last cases, the white communities had put up a fight against decolonisation, and many white people found it difficult to adjust to the realities of the world they found themselves in after independence by suddenly losing a higher economic and political status or being subjected to violence and threats from the new post-independent government. Many neutral observers feel that the failure of some newly independent African countries and their white minorities to come to terms with one another was to the mutual disadvantage of both parties; with some black Africans claiming that the higher positions whites in industries such as farming is a continued reminder of colonialism and disadvantage whereas the emigration or violent and forced expulsions of white Africans caused the economy and infrastructure to collapse and further impoverish the country. For example, expatriate white farmers and hoteliers from Zimbabwe have done much to revive agriculture and develop tourism in neighbouring Zambia.The Guardian, 22 July 2006 :Zambian tourism sector grows at expense of Zimbabwe

The white community was also the target of a degrading campaign by the Zimbabwean State media. Several state newspapers referred to white Zimbabweans as "Britain's Children" and "settlers and colonialists" even though many second and third generation white Zimbabweans have identified themselves as African first and foremost.

In 2006,The Telegraph, 2 February 2006 : Mugabe moves against white city people several residents (including British aristocrats) of the predominantly wealthy white Harare suburb of Borrowdale were evicted from their homes because of their proximity to Mugabe's new home in the area. In 2007, the exclusive suburb hit the headlines again when news emerged that 100 mainly white youths were arrested during a raid in the area's Glow night club, before being transported in two police buses and detained in the downtown central police station. According to eyewitnesses, several of the youths were attacked by Zimbabwean police. In 2008, The Guardian reported on the increasingly hostile situation that the urban white community were facing in Zimbabwe.

In March 2008, Zimbabweans took part in the Parliamentary and Presidential elections. High-profile white Zimbabwean candidates in these elections included David Coltart for the Senate and Trudy Stevenson, Eddie Cross, and Ian KayIAfrica News :Ian Kay in 2008 election  for the House of Assembly, with all of these candidates running for one of the Movement for Democratic Change factions (MDC-T) or (MDC-M). Coltart, Cross, and Kay were all elected, while Stevenson failed to take the Mount Pleasant seat in Harare for the Mutumbara faction of the MDC.

The MDC won both the Parliamentary and Presidential elections. On 16 September 2008, the formation of a new "unity" government was agreed with MDC leader Morgan Tsvangirai as Prime Minister. Senator Roy Bennett was nominated to be Minister of Lands, Agriculture, and Resettlement, while Cross was nominated to be Minister of International Trade.

In February 2009, The Times'' reported on the struggles the white community were facing, citing the struggle to afford food and the astronomical price of private healthcare, reporting that most white residents in Zimbabwe were financially dependent on relatives abroad.

In the same month, the UK Government confirmed that it would assist elderly British citizens living in Zimbabwe to resettle in the United Kingdom. The repatriation plan would focus on Britons over seventy years of age, while younger Britons with medical or other problems would also be eligible.

In February 2010, the international media reported that new government regulations stipulated that all white business owners must sign over a 51% majority share of their business to black Zimbabweans; a penalty for those who do not comply could result in imprisonment. The proposed law was later abandoned.

In March 2010, a group of dispossessed white farmers were handed the ownership documents of a valuable property in Cape Town owned by the Zimbabwean government by a South African court. The South African court had earlier ruled that land grabs in Zimbabwe were unlawful, and that property owned by the Zimbabwean government (not protected by diplomatic immunity) could be seized as compensation for victims of the land grabs. It is anticipated that other assets, such as Air Zimbabwe jets in South Africa, also could be seized.

The charity Zane ("Zimbabwe, a National Emergency") was established in 2002 to facilitate the repatriation of cash-strapped British passport holders resident in Zimbabwe. , it continued to support 1,800 white Zimbabweans, while also providing support to wider Zimbabwean society.

In 2017, new President Emmerson Mnangagwa's inaugural speech promised to pay compensation to the white farmers whose land was seized during the land reform programme. Rob Smart became the first white farmer whose land was returned within a month after President Mnangagwa was sworn in to office; he returned to his farm in Manicaland province by military escort. During the World Economic Forum 2018 in Davos, Mnangagwa also stated that his new government believes thinking about racial lines in farming and land ownership is "outdated", and should be a "philosophy of the past."

See also 

 British diaspora in Africa
 Greeks in Zimbabwe
 List of white Zimbabweans of European ancestry
 Racism in Zimbabwe
 Zimbabwean diaspora
 History of the Jews in Zimbabwe
 Zimbabweans
 White people
 Italian Zimbabweans

References

External links
 The Viscount disasters of 1978 and 1979
 Rhodesians Worldwide
 BBC report on 1965 Rhodesian general election
 The Zimbabwean Land Issue
Zimbabwean refugee farmers help to transform Zambian economy (The Guardian)
Sunday Times (London) 1984 report on white people in Zimbabwe
Selby, Angus (2006) "White Farmers in Zimbabwe, 1890–2005", PhD Thesis, Oxford University

Zimbabwe
Zimbabwe
Ethnic groups in Zimbabwe
History of Zimbabwe